The 2016–17 season was  Ipswich Town's 15th consecutive season in the second tier of English football and 139th year in existence. Along with competing in the Championship, the club will also participate in the FA Cup and League Cup.

The season covers the period from 1 July 2016 to 30 June 2017.

Kits
Supplier: Adidas / Sponsor: Marcus Evans Group

First-team squad

Left club during season

First-team coaching staff

Pre-season

Competitions

EFL Championship

League table

Results summary

Results by matchday

Matches

FA Cup

EFL Cup

Transfers

Transfers in

Loans in

Transfers out

Loans out

Squad statistics
All statistics updated as of end of season

Appearances and goals

|-
! colspan=14 style=background:#dcdcdc; text-align:center| Goalkeepers

|-
! colspan=14 style=background:#dcdcdc; text-align:center| Defenders

|-
! colspan=14 style=background:#dcdcdc; text-align:center| Midfielders

|-
! colspan=14 style=background:#dcdcdc; text-align:center| Forwards

|-
! colspan=14 style=background:#dcdcdc; text-align:center| Players transferred out during the season

Goalscorers

Assists

Clean sheets

Disciplinary record

Starting 11
Considering starts in all competitions

Awards

Player awards

References

Ipswich Town
Ipswich Town F.C. seasons